Senokos is a village in Balchik Municipality, Dobrich Province, northeastern Bulgaria.

Senokos Nunatak on Trinity Peninsula in Antarctica is named after the village.

References

Villages in Dobrich Province